Digital Telecom Internet Exchange ("DTEL-IX") is an Internet exchange point (IXP) situated in Kyiv, Ukraine. It was founded in 2009 to help establish peering for Ukrainian and international operators. This IXP currently has 239 members, with a maximum throughput of 2.2 Tbps.

History 

 Founded in 2009 and built its first POP in Newtelco Ukraine DC
 Started operations in BeMobile DC in February 2017 providing physical and virtual cross-connection services inside own meet-me-room.
 As of April 2017, DTEL-IX started to offer 100GE interfaces to its customers.
2019. Joined MANRS initiative after implementing MANRS for IXPs requirements.
Started migration to own data-center in 2021

DTEL-IX Services 
 Public peering via route servers with both IPv4 and IPv6;
 Private peering in public VLAN;
 Private peering in private VLANs;
 Colocation;
 Multicast exchange
 Physical Cross Connects in BeMobile DC

See also 
 List of Internet exchange points

References

External links
 
 Looking Glass
 Internet exchange points

Internet exchange points in Ukraine
Telecommunications in Ukraine